Star Wars: X-Wing Second Edition is the second edition of the miniature war game designed by Jay Little and produced by Fantasy Flight Games that was first announced on May 1, 2018, with the first release on September 13 of the same year. On November 16, 2020, Atomic Mass Games (another subsidiary of Asmodee) announced that it would be responsible for X-wing and its two sister games, Legion and Armada.

The games features tactical ship-to-ship dogfighting between various factions and starfighters set in the fictional Star Wars universe. The game is played in a series of rounds wherein both players set maneuvers for each of their ships in the battle area without knowledge of the opponent's maneuvers. The game is over when one player's fleet is entirely destroyed, or the timer runs out. The second edition of the game is compatible with the Star Wars: X-Wing Miniatures first edition ship models via the conversion kits made for each of the 5 factions (First Order and Resistance are separate factions in Second Edition), however, rules, tokens, and damage cards have all been changed, meaning that you will still need to buy a Second Edition Core Set or purchase each of these components individually.

There are also Epic rules for playing more scenario based games that can involve more than 2 players and immerse your combat into the Star Wars universe.

Game Description 
Publisher's Description of the Core Set: "Enter the next era of interstellar combat in the Star Wars galaxy! In X-Wing: Second Edition, you assemble a squadron of iconic starfighters from across the Star Wars saga and engage in fast-paced, high-stakes space combat with iconic pilots such as Luke Skywalker and Darth Vader.

With refined gameplay that focuses on the physical act of flying starships, X-Wing Second Edition lets you create your own Star Wars space battles right on your tabletop. Intuitive mechanics create the tense atmosphere of a firefight while beautifully pre-painted miniatures draw you deeper into the action. Man your ships and enter the fray!"

Additional Game Description: "Featuring stunningly detailed and painted miniatures, X-Wing recreates exciting Star Wars space battles from small engagements of only a couple of crafts, to large conflicts where multiple squadrons clash. Select and equip your ships, pick your crew, plan your attack, and complete your mission! 

Fast and visceral, X-Wing puts you in the middle of fierce Star Wars firefights. Use each craft’s unique maneuver dial to secretly plot its movement action for each turn. After each player has locked in his movement decisions, the dials are revealed and ships are moved. Pepper the enemy with blaster fire as you rush into the dogfight, or move into combat range slowly, attaining deadly target locks before you launch a devastating attack. No matter your plan of attack, you’ll be in total control throughout the tense action!"

The Core Set
The X-Wing Second Edition Core Set contains two TIE/ln fighter miniatures and one T-65 X-wing miniature, along with all of the maneuver templates, dials, cards, dice, and rules that you need to play the game.

Core set - Included Components

Ships 

 T-65 X-Wing
 TIE/ln Fighter (x2)

Pilots

Rebel Pilots 

 •Luke Skywalker
 •Jek Porkins
 Red Squadron Veteran
 Blue Squadron Escort

 Ship tokens are dual-sided and have the following front/back combinations:
 Luke Skywalker / Red Squadron Veteran
 Jek Porkins / Blue Squadron Escort

Imperial Pilots 

 •Iden Versio (x2 ship tokens; 1 pilot card)
 •Valen Rudor (x2 ship tokens; 1 pilot card)
 Black Squadron Ace (x2)
 •"Night Beast" (x2 ship tokens; 1 pilot card)
 Obsidian Squadron Pilot (x2)
 Academy Pilot (x2)

 Ship tokens are dual-sided and have the following front/back combinations:
 Iden Versio / Black Squadron Ace
 Iden Versio / Black Squadron Ace
 Valen Rudor / Obsidian Squadron Pilot
 Valen Rudor / Obsidian Squadron Pilot
 "Night Beast" / Academy Pilot
 "Night Beast" / Academy Pilot

Upgrades 

 Elusive - Talent
 Outmaneuver - Talent
 Predator - Talent

 Heightened Perception (x2) - Force
 Instinctive Aim - Force
 Sense (x2) - Force
 Supernatural Reflexes (x2) - Force

 Proton Torpedoes - Torpedo

 R2 Astromech - Astromech
 •R2-D2 - Astromech
 R3 Astromech - Astromech
 R5 Astromech - Astromech
 •R5-D8 - Astromech

 Servomotor S-foils - Configuration

 Hull Upgrade - Modification
 Shield Upgrade - Modification
 Afterburners - Modification

Tokens/Cardboard Assets 

 Asteroids (x3)
 Debris Clouds (x3)
 Disarm Token
 Critical Damage Markers (x3)
 Evade Tokens (x3)
 Focus Tokens (x4)
 Force Charge Markers (x2)
 Hyperspace Markers (x2)
 Ship ID Markers #1-6 (3 of each)
 Ion Tokens (x3)
 Initiative Marker
 Lock Tokens #1-6
 Position Markers (x2)
 Shield Tokens (x4)
 Standard Charge Markers (x6)
 Stress Tokens (x5)
 T-65 X-Wing Dial ID Token
 TIE/ln Fighter Dial ID Token (x2)

The Core Set also includes the quick start guide, rulebook, 3 small ship bases, 6 standard miniature pegs, 3 movement dial pegs, the T-65 X-Wing Movement Dial, 2 TIE/ln Fighter Movement Dials, a damage deck of 33 cards, a range ruler, 11 maneuver templates, 3 defense dice, 3 attack dice, 2 T-65 X-Wing quick build Cards, 2 TIE/ln Fighter quick build cards, and the 3 pre-assembled, pre-painted miniatures.

Factions
There are a total of 7 playable factions in the Second Edition of the game. Each faction is based on a side of the galaxy-wide conflicts set forth by the Skywalker Saga movies with the 7th faction being iconic characters who are unaligned across all 3 eras of conflict. While the core set features only two of the possible 7 playable factions –– the Rebel Alliance and the Galactic Empire –– the others are sold in expansion packs, or can be carried over from the first edition of the game using the aforementioned conversion kits.

 The Clone Wars
 Confederacy of Independent Systems (CIS)
 Galactic Republic
 Galactic Civil War
 Rebel Alliance
 Galactic Empire
 New Republic
 Resistance
 First Order
 Scum and Villainy (all conflicts)

Expansions

Wave 1 

(Announced: May 1, 2018 / Released: September 13, 2018)

Rebel Alliance Expansions
- T-65 X wing Expansion Pack

- BTL-A4 Y wing Expansion Pack

Galactic Empire Expansions
- TIE/ln Fighter Expansion Pack

- TIE Advanced x1 Expansion Pack

Scum & Villainy Expansions
- Slave 1 Expansion Pack

- Fang Fighter Expansion Pack

- Lando's Millennium Falcon Expansion Pack

Wave 2
Release Date: December 13, 2018

Resistance Expansion Packs





First Order Expansion Packs



Scum & Villainy Expansion Pack



Wave 3 
Release Date: March 21, 2019

Republic Expansion Packs



Delta-7 Aethersprite

V-19 Torrent

NOTE: Late into the production process, an error was found on the V-19 Torrent Dials. Corrected dial fronts, with the correct maneuvers, were shipped in this box in a separate plastic bag.





Separatist Alliance Expansion Packs



Belbullab-22 Starfighter

Vulture Class Droid Fighter

Other Supplies & Accessories
- X-Wing: Dice Pack

- Star Wars Dice (Dice rolling app for IOS and Android)

- X-Wing: Deluxe Movement Tools and Range Ruler

- Playmats:
X-Wing: Death Star Assault Playmat
X-Wing: Starfield Playmat
X-Wing: Death Star II Playmat
X-Wing: Bespin Playmat
X-Wing: Starkiller Base Playmat
X-Wing: Battle of Hoth Playmat
- Damage Decks:
X-Wing: Rebel Alliance Damage Deck
X-Wing: Galactic Empire Damage Deck
X-Wing: Scum and Villainy Damage Deck
X-Wing: Resistance Damage Deck
X-Wing: First Order Damage Deck
X-Wing: Galactic Republic Damage Deck
X-Wing: Separatist Alliance Damage Deck
- Maneuver Dial Upgrade Kits:
X-Wing: Rebel Alliance Maneuver Dial Upgrade Kit
X-Wing: Galactic Empire Maneuver Dial Upgrade Kit
X-Wing: Scum and Villainy Maneuver Dial Upgrade Kit
X-Wing: Resistance Maneuver Dial Upgrade Kit
X-Wing: First Order Maneuver Dial Upgrade Kit
X-Wing: Galactic Republic Maneuver Dial Upgrade Kit
X-Wing: Separatist Alliance Maneuver Dial Upgrade Kit

See also
 Galac-Tac
Star Wars Miniatures Battles
 Starweb

References

External links
Game main site at Fantasy Flight

Checklists of all Sets, Models and Cards from the X-Wing Game
Other Forums:
Fantasy Flight Games X-wing Forum
Official X-Wing Sub-reddit

Miniature wargames
Playscale miniaturism
Science fiction board wargames
Star Wars games
Wargames introduced in the 2010s